Dos Divas is a 2013 album by country music artists Lorrie Morgan and Pam Tillis. It features the single "I Know What You Did Last Night". The collection features 14 tracks; of these tracks, 6 are duets. The pair have recorded four tracks each as soloists for this collection.

Track listing

Personnel

 David Angell – violin
 Steve Brewster – drums
 Pat Buchanan – electric guitar, harmonica
 Chris Carmichael – strings
 Glen Caruba – stick, tambourine
 John Catchings – cello
 Billy Contreras – fiddle
 J.T. Corenflos – electric guitar
 Smith Curry – banjo, dobro, steel guitar
 Dan Dugmore – dobro, steel guitar
 Roger Eaten – electric guitar, background vocals
 Mary Sue Englund – background vocals
 Darin Favorite – electric guitar, soloist
 Tania Hancheroff – background vocals
 Don Herron – lap steel guitar
 Wes Hightower – background vocals
 John Barlow Jarvis – piano
 Kristen Gartner – background vocals
 Lona Heins – background vocals
 Megan Lynch – fiddle, strings, background vocals
 Lorrie Morgan – lead vocals, background vocals
 Craig Nelson – Arco bass, bass guitar
 Bethany Olds – background vocals 
 Mark Oliverius – Hammond B-3 organ, piano, upright piano, synthesizer, Wurlitzer
 Danny Parks – 12-string guitar, acoustic guitar, baritone guitar, electric guitar, gut string guitar, mandolin
 Brian Pruitt – drums, drum loops, percussion
 Michael Rhodes – bass guitar
 Chris Scruggs – lap steel guitar
 Steve Sheehan – acoustic guitar, resonator guitar
 Buddy Spicher – fiddle, violin
 David Spicher – bass guitar
 Matt Spicher – electric guitar
 Pam Tillis – lead vocals, background vocals
 Kenny Vaughan – electric guitar

Chart performance

References

2013 albums
Lorrie Morgan albums
Pam Tillis albums
Vocal duet albums